The National Marine Mammal Laboratory (NMML) is a United States research laboratory that undertakes research into marine mammals under the direction of the National Marine Fisheries Service and the National Oceanic and Atmospheric Administration.

The laboratory is responsible for all government-run marine mammal research across the United States. However, the Laboratory is based in Seattle, Washington, and research work tends to be focused on the coastal waters of California, Oregon, Washington and Alaska. Research tasks including stock quality and quantity assessment and in particular assessing trends in stock sizes. Research methods include satellite telemetry analysis and fieldwork from aircraft and ships.

References

Marine mammals
Laboratories in the United States